Founded in 1955, the NATO Parliamentary Assembly (NATO PA) serves as the consultative interparliamentary organisation for the North Atlantic Alliance. Its current President is Joëlle Garriaud-Maylam from France, elected in 2022. Its current Secretary General is Ruxandra Popa; she has been in this position since January 2020.

History 
The idea to engage Alliance Parliamentarians in collective deliberations on the problems confronting the transatlantic partnership first emerged in the early 1950s and took shape with the creation of an annual conference of NATO parliamentarians in 1955. The Assembly's creation reflected a desire on the part of legislators to give substance to the premise of the Washington Treaty of 1949 (also known as the North Atlantic Treaty) that NATO was the practical expression of a fundamentally political transatlantic alliance of democracies.

The foundation for cooperation between NATO and the NATO-PA was strengthened in December 1967 when the North Atlantic Council (NAC) authorized the NATO Secretary General to study how to achieve closer cooperation between the two bodies. As a result of these deliberations over the following year, the NATO Secretary General, after consultation with the NAC, implemented several measures to enhance the working relationship between NATO and the Assembly.  These measures included the Secretary General providing a response to all Assembly recommendations and resolutions adopted in its Plenary Sessions.

In response to the fall of the Berlin Wall at the end of the 1980s, the NATO-PA broadened its mandate by developing close relations with political leaders in Central and East European countries. Those ties, in turn, greatly facilitated the dialogue that NATO itself embarked upon with the region's governments.

Role 
Bringing together legislators from all the member states of the Atlantic Alliance, the NATO PA provides a link between NATO and the parliaments of its member nations.

At the same time, it facilitates parliamentary awareness and understanding of key security issues and contributes to a greater transparency of NATO policies.  Crucially, it helps maintain and strengthen the transatlantic relationship, which underpins the Atlantic Alliance.

Since the end of the Cold War the Assembly has assumed a new role by integrating into its work parliamentarians from those countries in Central and Eastern Europe and beyond who seek a closer association with NATO.  This integration has provided both political and practical assistance and has sought to contribute to the strengthening of parliamentary democracy throughout the Euro-Atlantic region, and complement and reinforce NATO's own programme of partnership and co-operation.

The Assembly was directly concerned with assisting in the process of ratification of the Protocols of Accession signed at the end of 1997, which culminated in the accession of the Czech Republic, Hungary and Poland to the Alliance in March 1999. It played the same role with respect to the ratification process leading to the accession of Bulgaria, Estonia, Latvia, Lithuania, Romania, Slovakia and Slovenia in March 2004.

Functioning 

The NATO PA consists of 269 delegates from the 30 NATO member countries. Delegates from 12 associate countries; the European Parliament; 4 regional partner and Mediterranean associate member countries; as well as parliamentary observers from 8 other parliaments; and 3 inter-parliamentary assemblies also take part in its activities.

Delegates to the assembly are nominated by their parliaments according to their national procedures, on the basis of party representation in the parliaments. The assembly therefore represents a broad spectrum of political opinion.

The assembly's governing body is the standing committee, which is composed of the head of each member delegation, the president, the vice-presidents, the treasurer and the secretary general.

The international secretariat, under its secretary general, is responsible for all administration and the bulk of research and analysis that supports the assembly's committees, sub-committees and other groups.

The headquarters of the assembly's 28-strong international secretariat is located in central Brussels.

Membership by participating state
The 269 delegates from the 30 member states are as follows; the final columns show the number of (non-voting) delegates from Associate Member states.

There are additionally four Regional Partner and Mediterranean Associate States, each with 3 non-voting delegates - Algeria, Israel, Jordan and Morocco. Finally, a number of other states and regional organisations have observer status at NATO Parliamentary Assembly sittings.

Financing
The assembly is directly funded by member parliaments and governments, and is financially and administratively separate from NATO itself. Each country's contribution is based on the NATO Civil Budget formula.

Committee structure
The five committees are: Civil Dimension of Security; Defence and Security; Economics and Security; Political; Science and Technology. They are charged with examining all major contemporary issues in their fields.

The committees and sub-committees produce reports, which are discussed in draft form at the assembly's spring session.  The reports are then revised and updated for discussion, amendment and adoption at the assembly's annual session in the autumn.

At the annual session, the committees also produce policy recommendations, which are voted on by the full assembly and forwarded to the North Atlantic Council and the NATO Secretary General and posted on the assembly's website.  The NATO Secretary General responds in writing to the assembly's recommendations.

Members of the assembly's committees undertake regular visits and meetings where they receive briefings from leading government and parliamentary representatives, as well as senior academics and experts. NATO-PA delegations also undertake visits to NATO mission areas such as Afghanistan and the Balkans.

Other bodies
Other assembly bodies include the Mediterranean and Middle East Special Group to enhance parliamentary dialogue and understanding with countries of the Middle East and the North African region, the Ukraine-NATO Interparliamentary Council, and the NATO-Georgia Interparliamentary Council. The NATO-Russia Parliamentary Committee was discontinued in April 2014 following Russia's military intervention in Ukraine and illegal annexation of Crimea.

Rose-Roth Programme
The Rose-Roth Programme of partnership and co-operation is designed to extend assistance to countries undergoing transition through difficult political and economic reforms. The program was initially designed to support Central and Eastern European countries but has subsequently focused mainly on the Balkans and the South Caucasus.  
 
Under this Programme, every year two to three Rose-Roth seminars are organized in a non-NATO country in partnership with the host nation parliament.  These events, attended by members of parliament from member and partner states as well as independent experts, focus on regional and topical security issues.  Along with additional training programmes for parliamentary staff and members of parliament, these events emphasize issues such as effective parliamentary oversight of defence and the military.

NATO Orientation Programme
The NATO Orientation programme is focused primarily on young or newly elected members of parliament from NATO and Euro-Atlantic Partnership Council (EAPC) nations, as well as those newly assigned to security or foreign affairs responsibilities.  The programme aims at providing an in-depth overview of the functioning and policies of NATO and SHAPE as well as of the Alliance's evolving relationships with its many partners.  The Programme was launched in 2000 and is held annually in Brussels.

Parliamentary Transatlantic Forum
In 2001, growing concern about the apparent drift in transatlantic attitudes, perceptions and policies, the assembly launched an annual "Parliamentary Transatlantic Forum" which brings together members of the assembly with senior US administration figures and academic experts.  The forum is held annually in Washington DC in co-operation with the U.S. National Defense University and the Atlantic Council of the United States.

Parliamentary groups
Many members of the Parliamentary Assembly belong to one of the informal parliamentary groups. The largest groups are the Socialist Group and the Group of Conservatives, Christian Democrats and Associates.

Relations with NATO 
There is no formal link between the NATO-PA and NATO although there is long history of cooperation that has intensified in the post–Cold War era.

The Assembly's Standing Committee meets annually with both the Secretary General and the Permanent Representatives to the North Atlantic Council at NATO Headquarters to exchange views on the state of the Alliance and to provide the perspectives of legislators. The Secretary General participates in the spring and autumn sessions of the Assembly as well as other special activities; he also provides a written response to the recommendations passed by the Assembly at its autumn session.  The Assembly's Presidents, in turn, participate in Summit meetings of the Alliance.

Supreme Allied Commander Europe (SACEUR) and other senior military officials in the NATO chain of command also regularly meet with Assembly members in various formats.

Relations with Russia, Ukraine and Georgia 

Expanding on the relationship the Assembly had developed with parliaments in Russia and Ukraine at the end of the Cold War, the Founding Act on Mutual Relations, Cooperation and Security between the Russian Federation and NATO, signed in May 1997, and the NATO-Ukraine Charter signed in July 1997, explicitly charged the Assembly with expanding its dialogue and cooperation with both the Russian Federal Assembly and the Ukrainian Rada. Relations with the Russian Federal Parliament were reappraised entirely following Russia's perceived military intervention in the Russo-Ukrainian War and annexation of Crimea.

The Assembly also created a bilateral group with the Georgian Parliament in 2009 to support Georgia's integration into Euro-Atlantic structures.

Following the 2022 Russian invasion of Ukraine, the NATO PA recognised in November 2022, Russia as a terrorist state.

Discontinued NATO-Russia Parliamentary Committee
Mirroring the creation in May 2002 of the NATO-Russia Council, a major step forward in NATO's cooperation with Russia, the Assembly created the NATO-Russia parliamentary Committee (NRPC).  Until it was discontinued in April 2014, the NATO-Russia Parliamentary Committee met twice a year during each of the Assembly's sessions in an "at 29" format and had become the main framework for direct NATO-Russia parliamentary relations. It consisted of the leaders of the Assembly's 28 member delegations and the leaders of the Russian delegation to the Assembly. In addition to the dialogue held within this the Committee, a 10-person delegation of the Russian Federal Assembly participated in the Assembly's Plenary Sessions as well as in many Assembly Committee and Sub-Committee meetings and seminars. In April 2014, the NATO PA decided to withdraw the Russian Parliament's associate membership of the Assembly, thus effectively ending regular institutional relations with the Russian Parliament.

Ukraine-NATO Interparliamentary Council
In 2002, the Assembly also decided to upgrade its special relationship with Ukraine by creating the Ukraine-NATO Interparliamentary Council (UNIC). The Assembly's cooperation with the Verkhovna Rada was progressively strengthened in the run-up to the Ukrainian Presidential elections in 2004. Members of the NATO-PA were involved in election monitoring, supporting the international community's effort.

The Ukraine-NATO Interparliamentary Council (UNIC) monitors NATO's relationship with Ukraine, paying particular attention to the parliamentary aspects of Ukraine's defence and political reform. In addition to the UNIC meetings biannually held in both Brussels and Kyiv, there is usually one Committee or Sub-Committee visit to Kiev each year.

Georgia-NATO Interparliamentary Council
In 2009, the Assembly approved the creation of a Georgia-NATO inter-parliamentary council.  The Georgia-NATO Interparliamentary Council is composed of the Assembly's Bureau (President, Vice-Presidents and Treasurer) and the 4-member Georgian delegation to the NATO PA.  The Group meets twice a year to discuss all aspects of Georgia-NATO cooperation and coordinate Assembly activities related to Georgia.

Mediterranean and Middle East Special Group 
The Assembly created in 1995 a Mediterranean Special Group with the aim of opening a political dialogue with legislators from countries of the Middle East and North Africa. The programme gradually expanded and the Assembly has now established relations at various levels with many parliaments across the Mediterranean, Northern and Central Africa, and the Middle East.

The Group meets three times a year either in NATO member countries or in the region. These meetings seek to enhance parliamentary awareness of the problems of the region, promote a political dialogue between parliamentarians, and share best practices among members of the respective parliaments.

Presidents 

  Wishart McLea Robertson (1955–1956)
  Wayne Hays (1956–1957)
  Johannes Josephus Fens (1957–1959)
  Antoine Béthouart (1959–1960)
  Nils Langhelle (1960–1961)
  Pietro Micara (1961–1962)
  Lord Crathorne (1962–1963)
  Georg Kliesing (1963–1964)
  Henri Moreau de Melen (1964–1965)
  José Soares da Fonseca (1965–1966)
  Jean-Eudes Dubé (1966–1967)
  Matthías Árni Mathiesen (1967–1968)
  Kasım Gülek (1968–1969)
  Wayne Hays (1969–1970)
  Romain Fandel (1970–1971)
  Terrence Murphy (1971–1972)
  John Peel (1972–1973)
  Knud Damgaard (1973–1975)
  Wayne Hays (1975–1977)
  Sir Geoffrey de Freitas (1977–1979)
  Paul Thyness (1979–1980)
  Jack Brooks (1980–1982)
  Peter Corterier (1982–1983)
  Sir Patrick Wall (1983–1985)
  Charles McCurdy Mathias Jr. (1985–1986)
  Ton Frinking (1986–1988)
  Sir Patrick Duffy (1988–1990)
  Charles Rose (1990–1992)
  Loïc Bouvard (1992–1994)
  Karsten Voigt (1994–1996)
  William V. Roth Jr.  (1996–1998)
  Javier Rupérez (1998–2000)
  Rafael Estrella (2000–2002)
  Doug Bereuter (2002–2004)
  Pierre Lellouche (2004–2006)
  Bert Koenders (2006–2007)
  José Lello (2007–2008)
  John S. Tanner (2008–2010)
  Karl A. Lamers (2010–2012)
  Sir Hugh Bayley (2012–2014)
  Mike Turner (2014–2016)
  Paolo Alli (2016–2018)
  Rasa Juknevičienė (2018)
  Madeleine Moon (2018–2019)
  Attila Mesterházy (2019–2020)
  Gerald Connolly (2020–2022)
  Joëlle Garriaud-Maylam (2022– )

References

External links
NATO Parliamentary Assembly

 
Intergovernmental organizations
Organizations established in 1955
Democracy
Parliamentary assemblies
Peace organizations